John Everett Benson (born 1939), known as Fud, is an American calligrapher, stonecarver and typeface designer who has created inscriptions for monuments including the John F. Kennedy memorial at Arlington National Cemetery, the National Gallery of Art, the Franklin Delano Roosevelt Memorial, and the Vietnam Memorial in Washington, DC.

Work 
John Everett Benson was born in Newport, Rhode Island. He began working for his father, John Howard Benson, at the age of fifteen at The John Stevens Shop. He studied sculpture at Rhode Island School of Design.  In 1964, Benson and John Hegnauer were commissioned to design and carve the inscriptions on the John F. Kennedy memorial at Arlington National Cemetery. In Rhode Island, Benson carved a number of inscriptions at the University of Rhode Island's Robert L. Carothers Library and Learning Commons.

He has designed and carved gravestones for Tennessee Williams, Lillian Hellman, and George Balanchine.

He has created monumental architectural inscriptions for famous buildings such as the Prudential Center in Boston, the National Gallery of Art, the Dallas Museum of Art, Rockefeller Center, Chicago Mercantile Exchange Center, and the Armand Hammer Museum of Art in Los Angeles. He lettered the date stones of the Vietnam Memorial in Washington, DC, the Civil Rights Memorial in Montgomery, Alabama, the Franklin Delano Roosevelt Memorial in Washington, DC and the Federal Courthouse in Boston. He designed the National Geographic Society headquarters lintel, West Point's MacArthur Monument, and the reverse of a medal for the National Gallery of Art.

He has drawn various photo-typefaces for architectural applications and a titling typeface, called Aardvark, for The Font Bureau in Boston, Alexa, Balzano, and Caliban.

In 1993, he left the direction of The John Stevens Shop to his son, Nicholas "Nick" Benson and returned to sculpting full-time.

Benson is currently doing portrait and figurative work in clay and bronze at his studio in Newport, Rhode Island.

Awards 

 Frederic W. Goudy Award, 2019

References

External links
Final Marks, The Art of the Carved Letter (1979), by Frank Muhly, Jr., Peter O'Neill
The John Stevens Shop

1939 births
Living people
American typographers and type designers
Artists from Newport, Rhode Island
Rhode Island School of Design alumni
Stone carvers